In mathematics, specifically in algebraic topology, the Eilenberg–Steenrod axioms are properties that homology theories of topological spaces have in common. The quintessential example of a homology theory satisfying the axioms is singular homology, developed by Samuel Eilenberg and Norman Steenrod.

One can define a homology theory as a sequence of functors satisfying the Eilenberg–Steenrod axioms. The axiomatic approach, which was developed in 1945, allows one to prove results, such as the Mayer–Vietoris sequence, that are common to all homology theories satisfying the axioms.

If one omits the dimension axiom (described below), then the remaining axioms define what is called an extraordinary homology theory. Extraordinary cohomology theories first arose in K-theory and cobordism.

Formal definition

The axioms are:

 Homotopy: Homotopic maps induce the same map in homology.
 Excision: If  is a pair and U is a subset of A such that the closure of U is contained in the interior of A, then the inclusion map  induces an isomorphism in homology.
 Dimension: Let P be the one-point space; then  for all .
 Additivity: If , the disjoint union of a family of topological spaces , then 
 Exactness: Each pair (X, A) induces a long exact sequence in homology, via the inclusions  and :

If P is the one point space, then  is called the coefficient group. For example, singular homology (taken with integer coefficients, as is most common) has as coefficients the integers.

Consequences

Some facts about homology groups can be derived directly from the axioms, such as the fact that homotopically equivalent spaces have isomorphic homology groups.

The homology of some relatively simple spaces, such as n-spheres, can be calculated directly from the axioms. From this it can be easily shown that the (n − 1)-sphere is not a retract of the n-disk. This is used in a proof of the Brouwer fixed point theorem.

Dimension axiom

A "homology-like" theory satisfying all of the Eilenberg–Steenrod axioms except the dimension axiom is called an extraordinary homology theory (dually, extraordinary cohomology theory). Important examples of these were found in the 1950s, such as topological K-theory and cobordism theory, which are extraordinary cohomology theories, and come with homology theories dual to them.

See also
 Zig-zag lemma

Notes

References
 
 
 

Homology theory
Mathematical axioms